Skyshaper is Covenant's sixth studio album.  It was released in Europe by Synthetic Symphony / SPV on 2006 March 3 and in the United States by Metropolis Records on 2006 March 7. It reached No. 44 in the German mainstream charts.

"Ritual Noise" was the album's first single, reaching No. 64 in Germany on 3 February 2006 (charting for 3 weeks) and No. 42 in Sweden on 26 January 2006 (charting for 2 weeks) and "Brave New World" was the second. The song "20 Hz" was featured in the 2005 video game Project Gotham Racing 3.

The band took 14 months to record this album.  According to Covenant band member Joakim Montelius, the band went through 150 revisions of "Brave New World", and also numerous revisions of several other songs on Skyshaper.

Track listing

Chart positions
Skyshaper

"Ritual Noise"

References

2006 albums
Covenant (band) albums
Metropolis Records albums